SWTX (Server / Workstation Technology eXtended) is a proprietary computer case and motherboard form factor used by Supermicro primarily for 4-socket servers. 

Longer but narrower than WTX, SWTX motherboards are not compatible with (E)ATX cases because of their size and mounting scheme. Likewise, ATX motherboards are not compatible with SWTX cases. 

Motherboard form factors